Silver Sands may refer to:

 Silver Sands, Alberta, a summer village in Alberta, Canada
 Silver Sands, South Australia, a beach and holiday resort south of Aldinga Beach, South Australia
 Silver Sands, United Kingdom, a part of the River Thames  
 Silver Sands, Western Australia, a suburb of Mandurah, Western Australia
 Silver Sands, Western Cape, a coastal town in South Africa
 Silver Sands FC, a football club in Christ Church, Barbados
 Silver Sands State Park, a recreation area in Milford, Connecticut, US

See also 
 "White Silver Sands", a song written in 1957 by Charles 'Red' Matthews